Immediate Family is a 1992 photography book by Sally Mann. The book is published by Aperture and contains 65 duotone images. The book predominately features Mann's three children, Emmett, Jessie and Virginia, who also appear on the front cover. 13 of the pictures show nudity and three show minor injuries; Emmett with a nosebleed, Jessie with a cut and stitches, and Jessie with a swollen eye. Several images from the book were re-published in Mann's next book, Still Time.

Production
The images within the book were taken between 1984 and 1991 in rural Virginia, where the children, and Mann herself, spent their childhoods. Photographs were taken with an 8 x 10 view camera. Mann originally decided not to publish the book until 10 years after the last photos had been taken, as her children would be older and more likely to understand the images. When Emmett and Jessie found out they protested, insisting that she publish it sooner. The children held the power to refuse any images being published. Virginia refused to let a photo of her urinating appear in the book and Emmet refused to allow a photo with him with his socks on his hands. Sally Mann commented her children seemed only concerned over being portrayed as "geeks" and showed no concern over nudity.

Reception
By September 1992, 300 prints from the book had already been ordered, earning "well over a half-million dollars".

The book was met with "great acclaim and discomfort". Critical review varied from praising the book as "timeless and magic," to chastising it as "pornographic and exploitative." Blake Morrison commented that Immediate Family made Mann famous for the wrong reasons; "because critics exaggerated the intimacy of the photos at the expense of their artfulness; and because the American religious right accused her of pornography when her camera was capturing beauty and transience."

In 1993 Steven Cantor directed the film Blood Ties: The Life and Work of Sally Mann, which focused largely on Mann's fight defending herself from allegations from the Christian right that her work was child pornography.

References

External links
Official profile at the publishers website

1992 non-fiction books
Books by Sally Mann
Books of nude photography